Yegor Vladimirovich Azyava (born 8 March 1983) is a former Belarusian and Russian football defender.

Club career
He was born and started his career in Belarus. He moved to Sakhalin in 2007 and later accepted Russian citizenship.

External links
 

1983 births
Living people
Belarusian footballers
Russian footballers
Association football defenders
FC SKVICH Minsk players
FC Molodechno players
FC Lida players
FC Osipovichi players
FC Belshina Bobruisk players
FC Veras Nesvizh players
FC Traktor Minsk players
FC Livadiya Dzerzhinsk players
FC Sakhalin Yuzhno-Sakhalinsk players
Belarusian Premier League players
Footballers from Minsk